Anna Elbakyan (born September 5, 1963) is an Armenian actress. She became an Armenian star after headlining the drama Where Have You Been, Man of God? (TV mini-series)(1992).

Biography
In 1982 she graduated from the Actors Studio of the Sundukyan State Academic Theatre of Yerevan
In 1986, she graduated from Yerevan State University Faculty of Social Sciences, specialty art
In 1982 to 1990, 1998 to 2003, and 2008 to present, actress of the Sundukyan State Academic Theatre of Yerevan
From 2000 to present, actress of the Drama and Comedy Theater after Edgar Elbakyan
from 2000 to present, director, and from 2005, chief director of the Yerevan State Marionettes Theater
Member of the Union of Cinematographers of RA
Member of the Union of Theatre Workers of RA

Filmography
The White Bone
Face-to-wall
Where have you been, man of God?
The Thief
Silhouette
Yerevan jan
Tavern
Elegy

Television
Irene - "The Eighth Day of the Creator" Kacha.
Girl - "Detention House Charents" Charents
Astghik "Higher Hell" by S. Papazian
Mary - "Ghosts" by E. de Filippo
Princess - "Crystal Love" L. Ustinov
Marguerite - "Mefistofele" by S. Aleshin
Solange - "The Sixth Floor."

Theatre work

Actor's work
Juliet - " Forty Days of Musa Dagh" by Franz Werfel.
Abbey - "Desire Under the Elms" Eugene O'Neill.
Lyalya - "Dear Elena" Lyudmila Razumovskaya.
Fanshetta - "Crazy Day or The Marriage of Figaro" by Pierre de Beaumarchais 1985
Valya - "The Bride of the North" J. Haroutunian.
Tatiana - "Finding Joy" Viktor Rozov.
Baiba - "Blow wind" John Rainis.
Author - "The Resistible Rise of Arturo Ui" Bertolt Brecht.
Armanda - "Life of Moliere," Mikhail Bulgakov.
Elsa - "Time of Your Life" by William Saroyan.
Agapi - "American adzhabsandal" Agassi Ayvazian.
Tom, Kitty - "Will you dance with me?" Based on the plays and short stories by William Saroyan.
Fat - "Red lights" Lily Elbakyan.
Katherine - "Suddenly, Last Summer" Tennessee Williams.
Alice - "Play Strindberg" Friedrich Dürrenmatt.
Maryam - "Belated bird" Author Anna and Armen Elbakyan.
Elmira - "Tartuffe ou L'Imposteur" by Molière.
Helen - "Oscar" by  1996
Cordelia - "King Lear" by William Shakespeare 1996
Agnes - "Bowl of Kindness" by William Saroyan.
Queen - "The Cave Dwellers" by William Saroyan.
Willie, Kitty, Jig - "Willie, Kitty, Jig ..." Tennessee Williams, Ernest Hemingway, William Saroyan.

Directing the work
Yerevan State Marionettes Theatre
"The Princess and the Pea " Hans Christian Andersen 2010
"Thumbelina" Hans Christian Andersen 2008
"How brave rooster won a fox" is based on Russian folk tales in 2007
"Star of Hope" in the Biblical explanation of 2005
"A true friend" - R. Marukhyan 2002
"Creation of Peace" based on the Bible in 2002
"Winter's Tale" - Anna Elbakyan 2000

Prizes and awards
2012 Armenian National Film Academy Award "Hayak" - the Best Actress
2011 People of the Year 2010 «LUXURY» - the Best Actress
2008 Armenian National Theater Academy Award "Artavazd" - the Best Actress
2006 Prize of the Ministry of Culture of RA "Artist" - the Best Actress
2005 Armenian National Theater Academy Award "Artavazd" - the Best Actress
2001 "Gold Medal" of the Ministry of Culture of RA

References

Armenian stage actresses
Armenian television actresses
1963 births
Living people
Actresses from Yerevan